Pusztai is a Hungarian surname.

Individuals named Pusztai
 Antal Pusztai, a Hungarian musician
 Árpád Pusztai, a Hungarian protein scientist
 Oliver Pusztai, a Hungarian footballer
 Liza Pusztai, a Hungarian fencer

Surnames